Churikatte is a 2018 Indian Kannada-language crime drama film directed by Raghu Shivamogga and starring Praveen Tej, Prerana Kambam, Achyuth Kumar, Sharath Lohitashwa and Balaji Manohar. The film takes place in a village named Churikatte in Malenadu and is about the timber mafia. The film is about how a stolen pistol affects the life of different people. Churikatte released to unanimous positive reviews.

Cast 
Praveen Tej as Adi
Prerana Kambam as Kala
Achyuth Kumar as Ravikanth 
Sharath Lohitashwa as Anna
Balaji Manohar as Seena
Dattanna as Adi's grandfather
Pramod Shetty as a member of the timber mafia gang
Manjunath Hegde as a corrupt forest police officer
Vivek Simha as Adi's friend

Production
Raghu Shivamogga previously directed a television serial and a short film before this film. Praveen Tej sports two looks in the film: a clean shaven lean look and a bulky look with facial hair. Newcomer Prerana Kambam plays a sweet and innocent village girl.

Reception
A. Sharadhaa of The New Indian Express wrote that "Overall, this crime thriller makes for a worthy piece of entertainment with convincing acting". Sunayana Suresh of The Times of India opined that "Watch Churikatte — it provides a good noir subject in Kannada after a while". A critic from Asianet stated that "This is a must-watch for the fans and non-fans of the genre alike".

Accolades

References

Indian crime drama films
2018 crime drama films